Boulindieng is a settlement in the Bignona Department of Ziguinchor Region of Senegal. It had a population of 502 in 2002.

References

External links
PEPAM

Populated places in the Bignona Department
Arrondissement of Tenghory